Raphael Pessoa (born March 9, 1989) is a Brazilian mixed martial artist who competes in the Heavyweight division of Absolute Championship Akhmat (ACA). He also formerly competed in the Ultimate Fighting Championship (UFC).

Mixed martial arts career

Early career

Pessoa fought mostly in Rio de Janeiro for NCE promotion, amassing an undefeated 9–0 record while also winning the NCE Heavyweight Title.

Ultimate Fighting Championship

Pessoa made his promotional debut on 10 August 2019 at UFC Fight Night: Shevchenko vs. Carmouche 2 against Ciryl Gane. Pessoa lost the fight by an arm triangle choke at the end of the first round.

Pessoa faced Jeff Hughes on October 26, 2019, at UFC on ESPN+ 20. He won the fight via unanimous decision.

Pessoa was expected to face Justin Tafa in a heavyweight bout at UFC Fight Night: Whittaker vs. Till on July 26, 2020. However, Tafa pulled out on July 15 due to unknown reasons and was replaced by Tanner Boser. He lost the fight via technical knockout in round two.

Pessoa tested positive for banned substance hydrochlorothiazide (HCTZ) and its metabolites chlorothiazide and 4-amino-6-chloro-1,3-benzenedisulfonamide (ACB) in a sample collected in an out-of-competition test on March 4. Pessoa was given a USADA suspension of one year retroactive from the date the positive sample was collected, making him eligible to return on March 4, 2021. Due to laboratory closures caused by the coronavirus pandemic, Pessoa was able to fight 5 months after the positive test was collected, losing to Tanner Boser via second-round TKO.

Pessoa is suspended by USADA for the second time for 2 years for positive for banned substance 7-Keto-DHEA and AOD-9064  Hydrochlorothiazide (HCTZ) and its metabolites Chlorothiazide and 4-amino-6-chloro-1,3-benzenedisulfonamide (ACB). The samples were collected from out-of-competition on February 9, 2021, February 15, 2021, February 16, 2021, and March 4, 2021. Ressoa also evaded sample collection on January 25, 2021, and January 28, 2021. The suspension retroactive from February 9, 2021, and he is eligible to fight again in February 2023.

Post UFC 
After his second suspension, Pessoa was released from the UFC. His first bout outside of the UFC was on August 28, 2021, against Mukhumat Vakhaev at ACA 127: Kerefov vs. Albaskhanov. Pessoa lost the bout via KO at the end of the first round.

Pessoa faced Daniel James at November 18, 2021 at ACA 132: Johnson vs. Vakhaev. He lost the bout via ground and pound TKO in the second round.

Pessoa faced Adam Bogatyrev on July 22, 2022 at ACA 141. He lost the bout via TKO stoppage early in the first round.

Mixed martial arts record

|-
|Loss
|align=center|10–5
|Adam Bogatyrev
|TKO (punches)
|ACA 141: Froes vs. Suleymanov
|
|align=center|1
|align=center|1:08
|Sochi, Russia
|
|-
|Loss
|align=center|10–4
|Daniel James
|TKO (punches)
|ACA 132: Johnson vs. Vakhaev
|
|align=center|2
|align=center|2:14
|Minsk, Belarus
|
|-
|Loss
|align=center|10–3
|Mukhomad Vakhaev
|KO (punches)
|ACA 127: Kerefov vs. Albaskhanov
|
|align=center|1
|align=center|4:28
|Krasnodar, Russia
|
|-
|Loss
|align=center|10–2
|Tanner Boser
| TKO (punches)
|UFC Fight Night: Whittaker vs. Till
|
|align=center|2
|align=center|2:36
|Abu Dhabi, United Arab Emirates
|
|-
| Win
| align=center| 10–1
| Jeff Hughes
|Decision (unanimous)
|UFC Fight Night: Maia vs. Askren 
|
|align=center|3
|align=center|5:00
|Kallang, Singapore
| 
|-
| Loss
| align=center| 9–1
| Ciryl Gane
|Submission (arm-triangle choke)
|UFC Fight Night: Shevchenko vs. Carmouche 2
|
|align=Center|1
|align=center|4:12
|Montevideo, Uruguay 
| 
|-
| Win
| align=center| 9–0
| Brian Heden
| TKO (punches)
| LFA 50
| 
| align=center| 1
| align=center| 1:39
| Prior Lake, Minnesota, United States
| 
|-
| Win
| align=center| 8–0
| Wagner Maia
| Decision (unanimous)
| Shooto Brazil 78
| 
| align=center| 3
| align=center| 5:00
| Rio de Janeiro, Brazil
| 
|-
| Win
| align=center| 7–0
| Diego Sagat
| TKO (punches)
| DC Fighters: DC Pro MMA
| 
| align=center| 1
| align=center| 0:23
| Rio de Janeiro, Brazil
| 
|-
| Win
| align=center| 6–0
| Carlos Alexandre
| TKO (punches)
| New Corpore Extreme 16: NCE Ladies
| 
| align=center| 1
| align=center| 2:56
| Rio de Janeiro, Brazil
| 
|-
| Win
| align=center| 5–0
| Luan Mendes Oliveira
| TKO (punches)
| Full Fight Championship 1
| 
| align=center| 1
| align=center| 0:48
| Rio de Janeiro, Brazil
| 
|-
| Win
| align=center| 4–0
| Leonardo Alves
| Decision (unanimous)
| New Corpore Extreme 13
| 
| align=center| 3
| align=center| 5:00
| Rio de Janeiro, Brazil
| 
|-
| Win
| align=center| 3–0
| Fábio Marongiu
| TKO (retirement)
| New Corpore Extreme 11
| 
| align=center| 2
| align=center| 5:00
| Rio de Janeiro, Brazil
| 
|-
| Win
| align=center| 2–0
| Romulo Ismael
| Submission (kimura)
| New Corpore Extreme 10
| 
| align=center| 1
| align=center| 1:34
| Rio de Janeiro, Brazil
| 
|-
| Win
| align=center| 1–0
| Bruno Luiz Nicolau
| KO
| New Corpore Extreme 9
| 
| align=center| 1
| align=center| 0:26
| Rio de Janeiro, Brazil
|

See also 
 List of current ACA fighters
List of male mixed martial artists

References

External links 
  
 

1989 births
Living people
Brazilian male mixed martial artists
Heavyweight mixed martial artists
Ultimate Fighting Championship male fighters
Doping cases in mixed martial arts
Brazilian sportspeople in doping cases